the 2016 Kuwait Super Cup was between league champions Qadsia SC and Emir cup champions Kuwait SC. This was the first super cup held in Jaber Al-Ahmad International Stadium. Kuwait SC won 3-2 on penalties.

References

External links
Kuwait League Fixtures and Results at FIFA
Kuwaiti Super Cup (Arabic)
xscores.com Kuwait 
goalzz.com - Super Cup
RSSSF.com - Kuwait - List of Champions

Super Cup
Kuwait SC matches
Kuwait Super Cup